Aleandro Rosi (born 17 May 1987) is an Italian footballer who plays for Serie B club Perugia. Known for his versatility, he plays as a full-back, a winger along the right flank, offensively and defensively, and for his pace.

Club career

Youth career
Rosi was originally in the Lazio youth system but switched over to Roma when he was 12 years old. He signed with A.S. Roma his first professional contract on 1 July 2004.

Roma
Rosi made his Serie A debut on 28 May 2005, when Roma drew 0–0 with Chievo Verona. That was his only appearance in his first season with Roma. He then appeared in fifteen games during the 2005–06 season. He scored his first Serie A goal against Parma on 24 September 2006. Rosi made his Champions League debut on 18 October 2006 in a 1–0 away victory over Olympiacos. Rosi was also part of the A.S. Roma team that lost 7–1 against Manchester United in April 2007. His second goal was scored against Messina during the last home game of the 2006–07 season.

Loans & Co-ownership
After a relatively unsuccessful loan spell with Chievo in the 2007–08 season, Roma loaned him to Serie B club Livorno for the 2008–2009 season where he made 37 appearances.

In August 2009, Rosi joined Siena in a co-ownership deal. Rosi played a total of 28 games for Siena, scoring his first and only goal for Siena in a 3–2 win over Bari which proved to be the winner.

For the 2010–11 Serie A season, Rosi was loaned back to Roma. He scored a winner in the club's victory against Bari.

A.S. Roma Return
For the 2011–12 season, Rosi returned to Roma.

Parma
Unwilling to spend another season on loan, Rosi and Roma terminated his contract by mutual consent on 7 August 2012. Rosi signed a five-year contract with Parma on the same day.

Genoa
In summer 2014 Rosi was sold to Genoa for €3.825 million, with Dániel Tőzsér moved to Parma for €3 million.

Perugia
On 5 February 2019, Rosi signed to Perugia until 30 June 2021.

International career
Rosi has represented Italy at different youth levels 15 times. Rosi made his last appearance in 2005 for the Italy under-19 football team. He was called to Italy under-21 football team in 2006.

Honours
Roma
Coppa Italia (1): 2006–07
Supercoppa Italiana (1): 2007

References

External links

1987 births
Living people
Italian footballers
Italy youth international footballers
S.S. Lazio players
A.S. Roma players
A.C. ChievoVerona players
U.S. Livorno 1915 players
A.C.N. Siena 1904 players
Parma Calcio 1913 players
U.S. Sassuolo Calcio players
Genoa C.F.C. players
ACF Fiorentina players
Frosinone Calcio players
F.C. Crotone players
A.C. Perugia Calcio players
Serie A players
Serie B players
Footballers from Rome
Association football midfielders